Ceralocyna foveicollis is a species of beetle in the family Cerambycidae. It was described by Buquet in 1854.

References

Ceralocyna
Beetles described in 1854